Surachat Sareepim (born 24 May 1986), simply known as Geng, is a Thai-Laotian professional footballer who plays as a forward or a right back for Thai League 1 club BG Pathum United.

Personal life
Surachat was born in Chiang Khan, Loei. His father is Thai and his mother is Lao, hailing from Xanamkhan, Laos.

International career
In 2011, Surachat was called up to the national team by Winfried Schäfer for the 2014 World Cup qualification third round.

International

Honours

Club
Police United
 Thai Division 1 League (2): 2009, 2015
BG Pathum United
 Thai League 1 (1): 2020–21
 Thai League 2 (1): 2019
 Thailand Champions Cup (2): 2021, 2022

References

External links
 
 Squad list at Police United
 Sareepim Profile at Goal
 

1986 births
Living people
Surachat Sareepim
Surachat Sareepim
Surachat Sareepim
Association football forwards
Surachat Sareepim
Surachat Sareepim
Surachat Sareepim
Surachat Sareepim
Surachat Sareepim